Nordic Labour Journal is an online magazine published by the Norwegian Work Research Institute in Oslo on commission from the Nordic Council of Ministers. The magazine was launched in 1996. The main focus is the labour market, work environments and labour law within the Nordic models, which are based on collective agreements between unions and employers in cooperation with the authorities. 

The editor-in-chief is Björn Lindahl.

The magazine has a  Scandinavian version, called Arbeidsliv i Norden, which was established in 1986.

References

External links
 

1996 establishments in Norway
Magazines established in 1996
Magazines published in Oslo
Multilingual magazines
Online magazines
Professional and trade magazines